Microcystaceae is family of cyanobacteria which contains the harmful algal bloom Microcystis aeruginosa.

Characteristics
The family is characterized by single, floating cells or colonies which are embedded to a matrix. There is also a lack of differentiation between apical and basal structures.

References

Chroococcales
Cyanobacteria families